The Supermarine Sheldrake was a British amphibian biplane flying boat developed by Supermarine from the Supermarine Seagull with a revised hull. It was powered by a Napier Lion engine mounted between the wings driving a four-bladed propeller. Only one Sheldrake, serial number N180, was built.

Specifications (Sheldrake N180)

See also

References

Further reading

 

Flying boats
1920s British military reconnaissance aircraft
Sheldrake
Biplanes
Amphibious aircraft
Single-engined tractor aircraft
Aircraft first flown in 1927